Friedrich Fetz (2 November 1927 – 25 October 2013) was an Austrian gymnast. He competed in eight events at the 1952 Summer Olympics.

References

1927 births
2013 deaths
Austrian male artistic gymnasts
Olympic gymnasts of Austria
Gymnasts at the 1952 Summer Olympics
People from Feldkirch District
Sportspeople from Vorarlberg
20th-century Austrian people